Old Bargersville is an unincorporated community in Union Township, Johnson County, Indiana.

History
This community was platted as Bargersville in 1850 by Jefferson Barger, and named for him. When Bargersville, Indiana, was established, the town's name was changed to Old Bargersville.

Geography

References

Unincorporated communities in Johnson County, Indiana
Unincorporated communities in Indiana
Indianapolis metropolitan area